VB Rocks was a fashion line designed by Victoria Beckham for Rock and Republic.

History
In 2004, after ending her music career, Victoria Beckham teamed up with Rock and Republic to design her own line of jeans. The original jeans were designed for women to 'lift their bum'. Different types of washes were used and Victoria's Crown logo was put on the back pocket. The jeans were high-end, retailing for $300.

The first jeans (originally 2 designs) and T-shirt (with the VB logo) were released in the UK right before the Christmas Shopping Season. Later the line was released in Japan and finally the U.S. In late 2005, Victoria had her first fashion show with her designs on the runway. These included jackets, T-shirts, jeans, and skirts; all of which have yet to be released to the public. In 2006, VB Rocks expanded to include a full women's line, children's wear, and men's jeans.

As of 2008, the line has since been discontinued. But Victoria continues to design fashion today.

References

External links
Rock and Republic official site

Clothing brands
Jeans
Victoria Beckham